Yasser Rayyan  (born 25 March 1970) is a retired Egyptian footballer. He is also the father of Ahmed Yasser Rayyan who is also a professional footballer.

Career
Rayyan played several seasons as a defender for El Ahly in the Egyptian Premier League.

He also played for the Egypt national football team, including participating at the 1992 Summer Olympics in Barcelona and the 1999 FIFA Confederations Cup in Mexico City.

References

External links

1970 births
Living people
Egyptian footballers
Egypt international footballers
Olympic footballers of Egypt
Footballers at the 1992 Summer Olympics
1998 African Cup of Nations players
1999 FIFA Confederations Cup players
Association football defenders
20th-century Egyptian people